Air Services Cargo was a short-lived cargo airline based in Panama City, Panama. The airline was operational between 2002 and 2003, operating cargo flights within the Americas from Albrook "Marcos A. Gelabert" International Airport, Panama City.

References

Defunct airlines of Panama
Defunct cargo airlines
Airlines established in 2002
Airlines disestablished in 2003
2002 establishments in Panama
Cargo airlines of Panama
Companies based in Panama City